The Fatal Secret is a 1733 tragedy by the British writer Lewis Theobald.

The original Covent Garden cast included Lacy Ryan as Ferdinand, Thomas Walker as Cardinal of Aragon, William Milward as Antonio, Thomas Chapman as Marquise of Pescara, William Paget as Flavio, Walter Aston as Urbino James Quin as Bosola, Elizabeth Vincent as the Duke of Malfy and Anne Hallam as the Duchess of Malfy. The prologue was written by Philip Frowde.

References

Bibliography
 Burling, William J. A Checklist of New Plays and Entertainments on the London Stage, 1700-1737. Fairleigh Dickinson Univ Press, 1992.
 Nicoll, Allardyce. A History of Early Eighteenth Century Drama: 1700-1750. CUP Archive, 1927.

1733 plays
Tragedy plays
Plays by Lewis Theobald